Samson Burke (born Samuel Burke; 8 April 1929) is a Canadian bodybuilder, swimmer, wrestler and actor.

Biography
Born Samuel Burke in Montreal Canada, Burke  earned a college degree in physical education. In the 1950s, Burke wrestled for nine years under the names "Sammy Berg" and "Mr Canada", and sparred with athletes including Primo Carnera, Antonino Rocca, Lou Thesz and Joe Lewis. His friend Gordon Mitchell recommended Burke for the lead role of Ursus in the 1961 film The Revenge of Ursus. Burke next appeared opposite Italian comedian Totò in the 1962 comedy Toto vs. Maciste. Norman Maurer then hired him to portray the mythical Greek hero Hercules in The Three Stooges Meet Hercules (1962).

As the sword and sandal craze faded, Burke played Little John in an Italian film called The Triumph of Robin Hood, Polyphemus in a 1968 Italian miniseries of The Odyssey, a villain in a Kommissar X film  (Death Trip), Harald Reinl's Nibelungenlied films, and appeared alongside Gianni Garko and Klaus Kinski in both a Spaghetti Western, Sartana the Gravedigger, and an Italian war film, Five for Hell (similar in theme to The Dirty Dozen). In the 1980s, Burke relocated to Hawaii and worked on the show Magnum, P.I. until it ceased production in 1988.

Championships and accomplishments
Worldwide Wrestling Associates / NWA Hollywood Wrestling
NWA International Television Tag Team Championship (1 time) - with Seymour Koenig

Stampede Wrestling 
NWA Canadian Heavyweight Championship (Calgary version) (1 time)

Notes

External links
http://www.samsonburke.com/

1929 births
20th-century professional wrestlers
Living people
Canadian bodybuilders
Canadian male film actors
Canadian male professional wrestlers
Male actors from Montreal
Male Spaghetti Western actors
McGill University Faculty of Education alumni
People associated with physical culture
Stampede Wrestling alumni
Professional wrestlers from Montreal
NWA Canadian Heavyweight Champions (Calgary version)